Brely Evans (born December 9, 1972) is an American actress, singer, songwriter, producer, author and comedian. She co-starred in a number of films, and in 2019 starred in the Oprah Winfrey Network prime time soap opera, Ambitions.

Life and career
Evans was born and raised in Oakland, California. She was briefly in the early 1990's R&B group Emage. Her first notable film role was in the 2010 romantic comedy Just Wright starring Queen Latifah. In 2012, she appeared in musical film Sparkle. Her other film credits include He's Mine Not Yours (2011), David E. Talbert's Suddenly Single (2012), Black Coffee (2014), The Man in 3B (2015), and the leading role in You Can't Fight Christmas (2017).

On television, Evans had a recurring roles on BET drama series Being Mary Jane and TV One comedy series Born Again Virgin. In 2019, Evans was cast in two series regular roles. First, a female lead on the Bounce TV comedy series Last Call opposite Charles Malik Whitfield. Later that year, she began starring in the Oprah Winfrey Network prime time soap opera, Ambitions playing Rondell Lancaster, the sister of Atlanta Mayor Evan Lancaster (Brian J. White). The series was canceled after one season.

In 2020, she appeared in the second season of BET crime drama The Family Business, and starred in the Urban Movie Channel comedy-drama series For the Love of Jason and Terror Lake Drive.

Filmography

Film

Television

Music Videos

References

External links
 
 

Living people
21st-century American actresses
African-American actresses
American film actresses
American television actresses
1972 births
21st-century African-American women
21st-century African-American people
20th-century African-American people
20th-century African-American women